The Bliss of Mrs. Blossom is a 1968 British comedy film directed by Joseph McGrath. The screenplay by Alec Coppel and Denis Norden was adapted from a play by Coppel that was based on a short story by Josef Shaftel, who served as the film's producer.

Plot
Robert Blossom is a brassiere manufacturer and workaholic. When his wife Harriet's sewing machine breaks, he sends his bumbling employee Ambrose Tuttle to repair it. Mrs. Blossom seduces Ambrose, then hides him in the attic, instructing him to sneak out in the middle of the night. However, Ambrose is enchanted by Harriet and decides to settle in to serve as her secret paramour. When Ambrose is reported missing, Det. Sgt. Dylan from Scotland Yard is assigned to the case, one he doggedly pursues for years. The mysterious noises Robert frequently hears overhead finally lead to his nervous breakdown, but Ambrose saves the day by passing along stock tips that turn his employer into a millionaire. The grateful Mr. Blossom, announcing his intention to devote himself to music, not only grants Harriet a divorce so Ambrose to remain with his wife, but also presents the couple with his factory as a wedding present.

Some time later, Ambrose, soberly dressed for the office, has breakfast with Harriet and leaves her for a day of business. Harriet stamps on the floor, and Robert ascends from the basement, dressed in a mod outfit reminiscent of a rockstar. They embrace.

Principal cast
Shirley MacLaine as Harriet Blossom 
Richard Attenborough as Robert Blossom 
James Booth as Ambrose Tuttle 
Freddie Jones as Det. Sgt. Dylan 
Bob Monkhouse as Dr. Taylor 
Patricia Routledge as Miss Reece
Willie Rushton as Dylan's Assistant
Sheila Steafel as Pet Shop Proprietress

Premise
The film is loosely based on the real-life story of Walburga Oesterreich, who kept her lover Otto Sanhuber in the attic for a decade beginning in 1912. The real story does not have the happy ending of the film.

Production notes
Joseph Shaftel said the script was based on a story of his, which in turn was based on a true story.

Shirley MacLaine was a last-minute replacement after the original star pulled out. Her fee was a reported $750,000.

Assheton Gorton served as the production designer for the film.

Location scenes were filmed in Putney, Bloomsbury, at the National Film Theatre in the South Bank Centre and at Alexandra Palace in London. Interiors were filmed at the Twickenham Film Studios in Twickenham.

The soundtrack includes the songs "The Way That I Live" performed by Jack Jones, "Let's Live for Love" by the Spectrum and "Fall in Love" by the New Vaudeville Band.

Frank Thornton, Barry Humphries, Willie Rushton and John Cleese make brief appearances in the film.

Reception
In his review in The New York Times, Howard Thompson called the film "roguish, restrained and absurdly likable, with a neat climactic twist."

Variety described the film as "a silly, campy and sophisticated marital comedy, always amusing and often hilarious in impact . . . although basically a one-joke story, [the] idea is fleshed out most satisfactorily so as to take undue attention away from the premise. Performances are all very good, Attenborough's in particular."

Time Out New York called the film a "coarse comedy which looks a little like Joe Orton gone disastrously wrong . . . any sparks in the script or performances are ruthlessly extinguished by atrocious direction."

References

External links
 

1968 films
British comedy films
1968 comedy films
British films based on plays
Films set in London
Films shot in London
Films shot at Twickenham Film Studios
Paramount Pictures films
Films directed by Joseph McGrath (film director)
Films scored by Riz Ortolani
1960s English-language films
1960s British films